HMS James Watt was a 91-gun steam and sail-powered second rate ship of the line. She had originally been ordered as one of a two ship class, with her sister , under the name HMS Audacious. She was renamed on 18 November 1847 in honour of James Watt, the purported inventor of the steam engine. (The steam engine was actually invented by Thomas Newcomen.) She was the only Royal Navy ship to bear this name. Both ships were reordered as screw propelled ships, James Watt in 1849, and Cressy in 1852. James Watt became one of the four-ship Agamemnon-class of ships of the line.  They were initially planned as 80-gun ships, but the first two ships built to the design,  and James Watt, were rerated on 26 March 1851 to 91 guns ships, later followed by the remainder of the class.

The ship had an overall length of 265 feet 3 inches, length between perpendiculars of 230 feet, and beam of 55 feet 5 inches. Her displacement was 3083 tons and her screw was driven by a 600 hp engine. She was built at the Royal Dockyard, Pembroke Dock, launched on 23 April 1853 and commissioned at Plymouth in January 1854 by Captain George Elliot.

She served in the Baltic campaigns of 1854 and 1855, despite the poor performance of the ship, and the dissatisfaction of Vice-Admiral Charles Napier. Her machinery, taken second hand from the iron frigate , was found to be unsatisfactory. 

By 1856 alterations to the machinery had cost £5,706, and from 1856 to 1857 she was commanded by Captain Talavera Anson. She was sold for breaking up to Castle, of Charlton in January 1875.

Notes

References

External links 
 

Ships of the line of the Royal Navy
Victorian-era ships of the line of the United Kingdom
Crimean War naval ships of the United Kingdom
Ships built in Pembroke Dock
1853 ships